The International Music Festival Český Krumlov is the longest-running summer music festival in the Czech Republic, having been established in 1992. Offering a wide range of musical genres performed by Czech and international artists, the Festival is held every July and August in the UNESCO world heritage town of Český Krumlov.

Artists at the festival

Soloists 
Soloists who have appeared at the IMF Český Krumlov include: Gianfranco Cécchele, Tracy Dahl, Gabriela Demeterová, Renée Fleming, Anastasiya Roytman, Allan Glasman, Václav Hudeček, Eugen Indjic, Mischa Maisky, Schlomo Mintz, Ivan Moravec, Steven Osborne, Mi-hae Park, Dagmar Pecková, Annamarie Popescu, Štěpán Rak, Pavel Šporcl, Janice Taylor, Jeanine Thames, Eva Urbanová, and Ivan Ženatý.

Conductors and orchestras 
Czech orchestras including Česká filharmonie Czech Philharmonic Orchestra, Pražští symfonikové Prague Symphony Orchestra, and SOČR have played under leadership of such conductors as: Gerd Albecht, Vladimír Válek, Vladimir Ashkenazy, Jiří Bělohlávek, Ondrej Lenárd and Maxim Šostakovič.

Other genres 
Some musicians who have played at IMF Český Krumlov: Maynard Ferguson, James Morrison, New York Voices. Eben Brothers, Hradišťan, and Čechomor

2011 
The 20th International Music Festival Český Krumlov ran from July 15 to August 20, 2011, and presented concerts ranging from baroque, classical, and romantic, to jazz and famous musicals. The series also featured operas at the Revolving Theatre in the Castle Gardens, including the tenors Ramón Vargas, José Cura, and Plácido Domingo.

External links 
 Official website of the International Music Festival Český Krumlov in English

Český Krumlov
Classical music festivals in the Czech Republic
Recurring events established in 1992
Tourist attractions in the South Bohemian Region
Summer events in the Czech Republic